The largest extant species of bird measured by mass is the common ostrich (Struthio camelus), closely followed by the Somali ostrich (Struthio molybdophanes). The Struthioniformes family are from the plains of Africa.

The bird with the largest wingspan is the wandering albatross (Diomedea exulans) of the Sub-Antarctic oceans.

Largest birds in history 

The largest bird in the fossil record may be the extinct elephant bird (Vorombe) of Madagascar, whose closest living relative is the kiwi. The Dromornis stirtoni of Australia, part of a 26,000-year-old group called mihirungs of the family Dromornithidae,  were of similar proportions to the largest elephant birds.

The tallest recorded bird was the South Island giant moa (Dinornis robustus), part of the moa family of New Zealand that went extinct around 1500 CE.

The heaviest bird ever capable of flight was Argentavis magnificens, the largest member of the extinct family Teratornithidae.

Largest extant birds

Table of heaviest extant bird species 
The following table is a list of the heaviest extant bird species based on maximum reported or reliable mass, with the average weight is also given for comparison. These species are almost all flightless, having denser bones and heavier bodies. Flightless birds comprise less than two percent of all extant bird species.

By families

Birds of prey (Accipitriformes) 

New World vultures are generally considered to belong to this order, although their inclusion is not accepted by all. If included, the largest species of this order, based on body weight and wingspan, is the Andean condor (Vultur gryphus) of western South America.
Excluding New World vultures, the largest extant species is the Eurasian black vulture (Aegypius monachus). Other vultures can be almost as large, with the Himalayan vulture (Gyps himalayensis) reaching lengths of up to  due to its long neck.
The largest living member of this order, in terms of length and height, is the secretarybird (Sagittarius serpentarius) of sub-Saharan Africa.
The largest living eagle is a source of contention. The up to  Philippine eagle (Pithecophaga jefferyi) has the greatest length of any eagle. The harpy and Philippine eagles, due to having to navigate in deep forest, are relatively short-winged and do not exceed , respectively, in wingspan. The white-tailed eagle (Haliaeetus albicilla) measures  in length with a  wingspan. The white-tailed eagle is sometimes considered the fourth-largest eagle in the world, and is on average the fourth-heaviest. However, less substantiated records indicate that the Steller's sea eagle may reach at least . The now extinct Haast's eagle (Hieraaetus moorei), which existed alongside early aboriginal people in New Zealand, was by far the largest eagle known and perhaps the largest raptor ever.

The largest of the accipitrine hawks is the northern goshawk (Accipiter gentilis) of the temperate Northern Hemisphere. The Henst's goshawk (Accipiter henstii) and Meyer's goshawk (Accipiter meyerianus) do rival it in terms of wing size and body mass.
Among the buteonine hawks, the largest species are the ferruginous hawk (Buteo regalis) and the upland buzzard (Buteo hemilasius) of North America and Asia respectively.
The largest species of kite is the red kite (Milvus milvus).

Waterfowl (Anseriformes) 

The largest species of goose is the Canada goose (Branta canadensis), more specifically the subspecies known as the giant Canada goose (Branta canadensis maxima).
The largest 'duck' species is the Muscovy duck (Cairina moschata) of the Americas. However, its genus is now considered to be paraphyletic with the species currently being placed in the subfamily Tadorninae (shelducks and shelgeese). If so, the largest species of the true ducks or dabbling ducks (Anatinae) is the mallard (Anas platyrhynchos).

Swifts and allies (Apodiformes) 

The largest species of Apodiformes is the white-naped swift (Streptoprocne semicollaris), endemic to southern Mexico, and the purple needletail (Hirundapus celebensis), of the Philippine islands.
Traditionally included in this order, by far the largest hummingbird species is the giant hummingbird (Patagona gigas) of the Andes Mountains.
The majority of this length is due to the hummingbird's extreme tail streamers. Another size champion among hummingbirds is the sword-billed hummingbird, a fairly large species of which approximately half of its  length derives from its bill. This is by far the largest bill-to-body-size ratio of any bird.

Nightjars and allies (Caprimulgiformes) 

The largest species of the nightjar family, the great eared nightjar (Eurostopodus macrotis) of East Asia, is of smaller proportions.

Shorebirds (Charadriiformes) 

The widely distributed Caspian tern (Hydroprogne caspia), is relatively large and heavily built.
However, until its extinction, the flightless great auk (Pinguinus impennis) of the North Atlantic was both the largest alcid and the second-largest member of the order.

Herons and allies (Ciconiiformes) 

Many of the largest flying birds in the fossil record may have been members of the Ciconiiformes. The heaviest flying bird ever, Argentavis magnificens, is part of a group, the teratorns, that is considered an ally of the New World vultures.
The largest ibis is the giant ibis (Thaumatibis gigantea).

Mousebirds (Coliiformes) 

Pigeons (Columbiformes) 

The largest species of the pigeon/dove complex is the Victoria crowned pigeon (Goura victoria) of Northern New Guinea.
The largest pigeons and doves known to have existed were the dodo (Raphus cucullatus) and the Rodrigues solitaire (Pezophaps solitaria). Both flightless species may have exceeded  in height.

Rollers, Kingfishers, Bee-eaters, motmots, and todies  (Coraciiformes) 

The common Australian species, the laughing kookaburra (Dacelo novaeguineae), may be heavier still, as individuals exceeding  are not uncommon.

Hornbills, hoopoe, and wood-hoopoes (Order Bucerotiformes)

Cuckoos, coucals and roadrunners (Cuculiformes) 

Falcons (Falconiformes) 

Many authorities now support the split of falcons from the Accipitriformes, despite similar adaptations, due to the genetic evidence showing they are not closely related. The largest species of falcon is the gyrfalcon (Falco rusticolus).

Gamebirds (Galliformes) 

The heaviest member of this order is the North American wild turkey (Meleagris gallopavo).

Loons (Gaviiformes) 

Wingspans of the largest loons can reach .

Cranes and allies (Gruiformes) 

The aforementioned "terror bird", Brontornis burmeisteri, has traditionally been classified as a member of this order, although this may not be an accurate classification.

Songbirds (Passeriformes) 

The passerine or songbird order comprises more than half of all bird species, and are known for their generally small size, their strong voices and their frequent perching. Corvids are the largest of passerines, particularly the large races of the common raven (Corvus corax) and the Northeast African thick-billed raven (C. crassirostris).
The largest bird family in Eurasia is the Old World warblers.
Among the most variably sized passerine families is the icterids.
The latter species competes with the similarly sized Amazonian umbrellabird (Cephalopterus ornatus) as the largest passerine in South America.

Cormorants and allies (Pelecaniformes) 

Pelicans rank amongst the largest flying birds. The great white pelican (P. onocrotalus) of Europe and Africa is almost as large.
Pelagornithidae or pseudotooth birds included several species that were behind only Argentavis magnificens in size among all flying birds. Characterized by the tooth-like protrusions along their bills, this unique family has been variously allied with the Pelecaniformes, tubenoses, large waders and even waterfowl. Their true linkage to extant birds remains in question, though pelecaniformes are the group most regularly considered related. Some of the largest pseudotooth birds have included, Osteodontornis of the late Miocene from the North Pacific, Gigantornis eaglesomei, from the Eocene era in what is now Nigeria and Dasornis, from Eocene era Europe. A new, unnamed species has been discovered which may outsize even these giants.

Tropicbirds (Phaethontiformes) 

The largest tropicbirds is the red-billed tropicbird (Phaethon aethereus). The adult is a slender, mainly white bird, 48 cm long, excluding the central tail feathers which double the total length, and a one-meter wingspan.

Flamingos (Phoenicopteriformes) 

The largest flamingo is the greater flamingo (Phoenicopterus roseus) of Eurasia and Africa.

Woodpeckers and allies (Piciformes) 

The largest species of this order is the toco toucan (Ramphastos toco) of the neotropic forest.
This species is generally believed to have gone extinct following habitat destruction and hunting. Despite possibilities that it has survived in some deep swamp forests in Arkansas or Florida, the ivory-billed is also generally considered to have gone extinct.
The largest jacamar is the great jacamar (Jacamerops aureus).

Grebes (Podicipediformes) 

The largest species of grebe is the South American great grebe (Podiceps major).

Tubenoses (Procellariiformes) 

The largest species of Procellariiformes is the wandering albatross (Diomedea exulans) of the sub-Antarctic oceans, which has the largest wingspan of any living bird. Unverified specimens have been reported to measure .
The Southern royal albatross (Diomedea epomophora) is slightly lesser in length, wingspan and weight.
The largest procellarids is the southern giant petrel (Macronectes giganteus). It can reach a body length of 1 m (39 in), with a wingspan of 2.1 m (83 in) and a weight of 8 kg (17.6 lb).

Hoatzin (Opisthocomiformes) 

Parrots (Psittaciformes) 

The heaviest parrot is the nearly extinct kakapo (Strigops habroptilus), which is part of the New Zealand parrot family.
The largest parakeet is the Alexandrine parakeet (Palaeornis eupatoria), reaching lengths of up to 60 centimetres and a mass of 250 grams.

Sandgrouse (Pterocliformes) 

Penguins (Sphenisciformes) 

Owls (Strigiformes) 

The most massive owl is certainly either the Eurasian eagle-owl (Bubo bubo) or the endangered and similarly sized Blakiston's fish owl (Bubo blakistoni) of coastal Russia and Japan.
The largest owl known to have existed was Ornimegalonyx oteroi of Cuba, a uniquely cursorial owl.

Ratites (Struthioniformes) 

The largest ratite is the ostrich (Struthio camelus), from the plains of Africa and Arabia. A mass of  has been cited for the ostrich but no wild ostriches of this weight have been verified. Eggs laid by the ostrich are the largest in the world, weighing .
The largest bird in the fossil record may be the extinct elephant birds (Vorombe/Aepyornis) of Madagascar, which were related to the ostrich. The last of the elephant birds became extinct approximately 1000 years ago.
The tallest bird ever was the South Island giant moa (Dinornis robustus), part of the moa family of New Zealand that went extinct about 500 years ago.

Tinamous (Tinamiformes) 

The largest species of tinamou, a group of chunky, elusive ground-birds from neotropical forests, is the grey tinamou (Tinamus tao) of western South America.

Trogons (Trogoniformes) 

The resplendent quetzal (Pharomachrus mocinno) of the montane forest of Central America is the largest trogon, though a few other quetzals approach similar sizes.

See also
 Dinosaur size

References

Birds
Largest